Mutual Aid: A Factor of Evolution is a 1902 collection of anthropological essays by Russian naturalist and anarchist philosopher Peter Kropotkin. The essays, initially published in the English periodical The Nineteenth Century between 1890 and 1896, explore the role of mutually-beneficial cooperation and reciprocity (or "mutual aid") in the animal kingdom and human societies both past and present. It is an argument against theories of social Darwinism that emphasize competition and survival of the fittest, and against the romantic depictions by writers such as Jean-Jacques Rousseau, who thought that cooperation was motivated by universal love. Instead Kropotkin argues that mutual aid has pragmatic advantages for the survival of human and animal communities and, along with the conscience, has been promoted through natural selection.

Mutual Aid is considered a fundamental text in anarchist communism. It presents a scientific basis for communism as an alternative to the historical materialism of the Marxists. Kropotkin considers the importance of mutual aid for prosperity and survival in the animal kingdom, in indigenous and early European societies, in the medieval free cities (especially through the guilds), and in the late 19th century village, labor movement, and poor folk. He criticizes the State for destroying historically important mutual aid institutions, particularly through the imposition of private property.

Many biologists (including Stephen Jay Gould, one of the most influential evolutionary biologists of his generation) also consider it an important catalyst in the scientific study of cooperation.

Reception
Daniel P. Todes, in his account of Russian naturalism in the 19th century, concludes that Kropotkin's work "cannot be dismissed as the idiosyncratic product of an anarchist dabbling in biology" and that his views "were but one expression of a broad current in Russian evolutionary thought that pre-dated, indeed encouraged, his work on the subject and was by no means confined to leftist thinkers."

Kropotkin emphasizes the distinction between competitive struggle between individual organisms over limited resources and collective struggle between organisms and the environment. He drew from his first hand observations of Siberia and Northeast Asia, where he saw that animal populations were limited not by food sources, which were abundant, but rather by harsh weather. For example, predatory birds may compete by stealing food from one another while migratory birds cooperate in order to survive harsh winters by traveling long distances.  He did not deny the competitive form of struggle, but argued that the cooperative counterpart has been under-emphasized: "There is an immense amount of warfare and extermination going on amidst various species; there is, at the same time, as much, or perhaps even more, of mutual support, mutual aid, and mutual defense... Sociability is as much a law of nature as mutual struggle."

As a description of biology, Kropotkin's perspective is consistent with contemporary understanding. Stephen Jay Gould admired Kropotkin's observations, noting that cooperation, if it increases individual survival, is not ruled out by natural selection, and is in fact encouraged.  Kropotkin's ideas anticipate the now recognized importance of mutualism (a beneficial relationship between two different species) and altruism (when one member of a species aids another) in biology. Examples of altruism in animals include kin selection and reciprocal altruism. Douglas H. Boucher places Kropotkin's book as a precursor to the development of the biological theory of altruism.

Editions

 Includes Kropotkin's 1914 preface, Foreword and Bibliography by Ashley Montagu, and The Struggle for Existence, by Thomas H. Huxley

See also

 A Darwinian Left: Politics, Evolution and Cooperation
 Ethology
 Evolutionary anthropology
 Psychological egoism
 List of books about anarchism

References

External links

Mutual Aid: A Factor of Evolution at The Anarchist Library
Mutual Aid: A Factor of Evolution at Libcom.org
 
 Mutual Aid: A Factor of Evolution – HTML version at the Anarchy Archives
 Mutual Aid: A Factor of Evolution – Plain PDF version at the RevoltLib
 
 Paul Mattick, Kropotkin on Mutual Aid — Review, 1956.
 Iain McKay, Mutual Aid: An Introduction and Evaluation, AK Press, Edinburgh, 2010.

Works by Peter Kropotkin
1902 non-fiction books
Books about evolution
Heinemann (publisher) books
Mutualism (biology)
Philosophy books
Works originally published in Nineteenth Century (periodical)